Société Bic S.A., commonly called Bic and stylized as BiC, is a French manufacturing corporation based in Clichy, Hauts-de-Seine. It sells a world-leading brand of lighters and pens since its founding by Marcel Bich (1914–1994) in 1945, and a competitive amount of shaving goods. For several years, it sponsored Formula One and bicycle racers.

History 
In 1942, Marcel Bich and his partner, Édouard Buffard, set up a business creating writing instrument parts in a factory in the Paris suburb of Clichy, where they began production of pen holders and pencil cases. Marcel Bich bought the patent for the ballpoint pen from Hungarian inventor László Bíró, and using Swiss watchmaking tools, he devised a manufacturing process that produced stainless-steel balls for the tip of the pen.  Bich soon perfected the design of the ballpoint pen, and the Bic Cristal ballpoint pen became the company's first product in 1950.

Bich formed Société Bic in 1953, and the company was listed on the Paris Stock Exchange in 1972. The design of the pen has remained mostly unchanged since its initial launch, and as of 2021, remains the best-selling pen in the world.

Global expansion 
Between 1950 and the 1970s, Bic expanded globally into Italy, the Netherlands, Austria, Switzerland, and Spain. In 1958, the takeover of the American company "Waterman Pen Company" allowed Bic to establish itself in the United States.

In December 2015, Bic acquired 100 percent ownership in Cello Writing, India, and the company was renamed as "Bic Cello (India)". Cello was founded in 1995 and, as of December 2015, is India's largest manufacturer and distributor of writing instruments. In 2019 Bic inaugurated a new facility located in Nairobi, Kenya, which serves the East Africa region. As of May 2021, Bic has over 25 factories around the world. Bic's global headquarters remains in Clichy, outside of Paris, France. Its U.S. headquarters are in Shelton, Connecticut.

Products and product diversification

Stationery 
Following the success of the Bic Cristal ballpoint pen, Bic released its next pen, the 4 color pen, in 1970. The 4 color pen allowed one to change the ink color without changing the pen.

Lighters 
In 1970, Gillette purchased S. T. Dupont Paris, whose principal product was luxury cigarette lighters. During this time Dupont explored the possibilities of marketing a disposable lighter, developing an inexpensive disposable lighter called Cricket, which it introduced in the United States in 1972. Later that year Bic was test marketing a disposable lighter that could provide 3,000 lights before wearing out; Bic introduced this lighter in 1973. Typically the most affordable lighter on the market, the Bic disposable lighter was extremely popular and remains so today. Bic also started to produce disposable razors during the 1970s. In 1975, the brand released the one-piece polystyrene razor, which became a highly demanded product.

Razors 

During the 1980s, Bic shaving products reached $52 million in sales and conquered 22.4% of the market shares. In 1981, Bic began a subsidiary called Bic Sport, which manufactured and sold water sports products. Bic announced the sale of Bic Sport to the Estonian company Tahe Outdoor in 2019.

In 1989, Bic attempted further product diversification with the introduction of pocket-sized perfume spritzers.

1990s–present 
In 1992, Bic purchased Wite-Out Products, an American brand of correction products, and subsequently reintroduced the correction fluid as Bic Wite Out.

Bic's shaving portfolio expanded throughout the 1990s and 2000s, adding the Soleil, a brand of razors for women, in 2004, and increasing the number of blades until the Flex 5 launched, with five blades, in January 2015 in the United States.

The BiC Phone 

In the summer of 2008, Bic launched the Bic Phone, marketed primarily in France and Belgium. It was advertised as a ready-to-use phone with one hour of communication and integrated SIM card and charged battery. The SIM card came loaded with 10 minutes of prepaid calls.

In 2011, it was priced at €29 and came in 4 colors. The phone was the result of a partnership between Bic and Orange S.A., though it was manufactured and distributed by Alcatel-Lucent.

2018–present  
In 2018, Bic introduced a new line of temporary tattoo markers called BodyMark by Bic. Soon after, in 2019, Bic launched the Made For You grooming line, a line of shaving products without gender labels.

In 2020, Bic purchased Djeep, a manufacturer of high-end and personalized lighters. The acquisition allowed Bic to expand its customizable lighter offerings. That same year, Bic acquired Rocketbook, the leading smart reusable notebook brand in the U.S., in order to bring together analog and digital writing.

The company introduced a new line of eco-friendly stationery products called Bic ReVolution in 2021. All are made of at least 50% recycled plastic. The paperboard used in all of the packaging is made of 100% recycled content.

In May 2021, Bic launched an ad campaign featuring Martha Stewart and Snoop Dogg.

In January 2022, Bic acquired Inkbox, a semi-permanent tattoo brand.

Ownership 
The Bich family owns about 46% of issued shares and controls 63% of its voting power.

Sponsorship 

Bic sponsored a professional cycling team in the 1960s, led by Tour de France winners Jacques Anquetil and Luis Ocaña. The company began sponsoring the Tour again in 2011 as an "official supporter", which they have continued to do to the present day.

Bic also sponsored the Alain Prost–led Prost Grand Prix team in Formula One from 1997 to 2000.

Corporate identity

Logo 
The corporate logo comprises two parts; a rhomboid with curved corners, left and right sides angled upward and containing the letters "BiC" with "i" the only one in lower case, and the Bic Boy to its left. The rhomboid, which debuted in 1950 to coincide with the launch of the Bic Cristal, was originally red with white letters. The font of the letters remains unchanged. The Bic Boy is described on the corporation's website as "a schoolboy, with a head in the shape of a ball, holding a pen behind his back." The ball is the tungsten carbide one that was the key feature in Bic's new ballpoint pens in 1960. The schoolboy was designed by Raymond Savignac who also developed the product's "Nouvelle Bille" (new ballpoint) advertising campaign, which was intended to attract the attention of children. When the Bic Boy was added to the left of the rhomboid one year later in 1961, both changed to the newly adopted official corporate color of orange (Pantone 1235C).

In popular culture 
In 2018, Centquatre-Paris featured a Bic exhibition, which included 150 works created with the Bic collection. The exhibition included works from works by Alberto Giacometti, René Magritte and Fernand Léger, Martin Parr and Mamadou Cissé.

The Bic Cristal is exhibited at the Museum of Modern Art in New York and the Center Pompidou in Paris.

In 2020, the Bic Corporate Foundation was recognized in the Netflix Documentary On Est Ensemble. The film follows French social entrepreneur Stephane de Freitas on his journey to meet social change worldwide, introducing viewers to the organization's work in Brazil to educate and empower women.

In July 2021, Bic partnered with iconic French 19th-century department store La Samaritaine to create a limited-edition collection of products inspired by the façade for which it is famous.

Additionally, in August 2021, to celebrate more than 70 years of the Cristal Ballpoint Pen, Bic has collaborated with luxury French malletier, Pinel et Pinel, on the launch of a special-edition version of its iconic pen.

Filmography 
 Le Bic Cristal, a documentary for television directed by Danielle Schirman and first aired on Arte in October 2005.

References

External links 

 
 Société Bic Company Profile and News—Bloomberg

Fountain pen and ink manufacturers
Cigarette lighter brands
Writing implement manufacturers
Manufacturing companies of France
Manufacturing companies established in 1945
French companies established in 1945
French brands
Personal care brands
Razor brands
Companies based in Île-de-France
Companies listed on Euronext Paris
Lighters (firelighting)
1970s initial public offerings